Tomas Chester (born 11 May 2001) is an Australian rugby league footballer who plays as a  for the North Queensland Cowboys in the NRL.

Background 
Born in Townsville, Queensland, Chester played his junior rugby league for Townsville Brothers and attended Ignatius Park College.

Playing career

Early career
In 2020, Chester played for the Townsville Brothers A-Grade side before signing for the North Queensland Cowboys.

2022
In the 2022 pre-season, Chester joined the North Queensland NRL squad and played in their trial win over the South Sydney Rabbitohs, making the move to fullback. He then began the season playing for the Blackhawks in the Queensland Cup.

On 6 April, he re-signed with the North Queensland outfit until the end of the 2024 season.

In Round 18 of the 2022 NRL season, he made his first grade debut off the bench against the Cronulla-Sutherland Sharks.

References

External links 
North Queensland Cowboys profile

2001 births
Living people
Australian rugby league players
North Queensland Cowboys players
Rugby league fullbacks
Rugby league players from Townsville
Townsville Blackhawks players